Memory model may refer to:

Psychology
Atkinson–Shiffrin memory model
Baddeley's model of working memory
Memory-prediction model

Computer science
 Memory model (programming) describes how threads interact through memory
 Java Memory Model
 Consistency model
 Memory model (addressing scheme), an addressing scheme for computer memory address space
 Flat memory model
 Paged memory model
 Segmented memory
 One of the x86 memory models